The Sting is a 2002 album by various artists affiliated with or part of the Wu-Tang Clan.

Track listing

Track listing information is taken from the official liner notes and AllMusic.

Notes
 "Killa Beez" features uncredited vocals by Blue Raspberry.
 "Doe Rae Wu" erroneously lists Kinetic as featured rapper.
 "Dancing With Wolves" featured uncredited vocals by Prodical of the Sunz of Man.
 "KB Ridin'" does not feature the entire Wu-Tang Clan, but only raps by Method Man and Ghostface Killah.
 "Odyssey" features raps by Bobby Digital.
 "Thirsty (Skit)" features raps by Bobby Digital and Kinetic.
 "Digi-Electronics" features raps by Free Murder.
 "Billy" features raps by Bobby Digital.

References

Wu-Tang Clan albums
2002 albums
Albums produced by 4th Disciple
Albums produced by RZA